WXEI-LP (95.3 FM) is a radio station broadcasting a News/Talk radio format. Licensed to Crestview, Florida, United States, the station serves the Crestview/Fort Walton Beach area.  The station is currently owned by X-Static Enterprises Inc. WXEI's most popular aired program is the nationally syndicated radio talk show "Jon Arthur Live!" airing Monday-Friday at 7 PM Central. Jon Arthur Live! is also broadcast on the First Amendment Radio Network.

External links
 WXEI website
 

XEI-LP
XEI-LP
News and talk radio stations in the United States
Okaloosa County, Florida
2004 establishments in Florida
Radio stations established in 2004